Shuiyuan is a town in Huanjiang Maonan Autonomous County, Guangxi, China.

Administrative division
As of 2021, the town is divided into two communities and eleven villages: 
Shuiyuan Community
Shangnan Community
Zhongjian
Heping
Lila
Xili
Sancai
Sanmei
Hanxiang
Wenping
Shandong
Minquan
Gedan

History
The area of modern-day Shuiyuan Town was part of the Longyuan County during the Tang dynasty (618–907). In 1075, in the ruling of Emperor Shenzong of Song dynasty (906–1279), Longyuan County was merged into Si'en County.

In 1933 during the Republic of China, the area belonged to Shuiyuan Township and Shangnan Township.

In 1958, Red Sun People's Commune was founded and one year later split into three communes, namely Sanmei People's Commune, Longsheng People's Commune, and Shuiyuan People's Commune. In 1962, the three communes merged to form Shuiyuan District, which was renamed Shuiyuan People's Commune in 1965. In 1984, Shuiyuan People's Commune split into two townships: Shuiyuan Township and Shangnan Maonan Ethnic Township (later renamed Shangnan Township in 1987).  In 1996, it was upgraded to a town. In 2005, Shangnan Township was merged into Shuiyuan Town.

Geography
The town is situated at the south of Huanjiang Maonan Autonomous County. It is surrounded by Luoyang Town and Xianan Township on the northwest and northeast, Si'en Town on the east, and Jinchengjiang District on the south.

Climate
The town enjoys a subtropical humid monsoon climate, characterized by four distinct seasons, sufficient sunlight, abundant rainfall and long frost free period.

Economy
The town's economy is based on nearby mineral resources and agricultural resources. The main crops of the region are rice, followed by corn and soybean. Sugarcane is one of the important economic crops in the region. The region also has an abundance of silicon.

Demographics

The 2019 census showed the town's population to be 42,255, an increase of 1.0% from the 2011 census.

Transportation
The Provincial Highway S309 passes across the town north to south.

References

Bibliography

 

Divisions of Huanjiang Maonan Autonomous County